New Ireland may refer to:

Geography 

 New Ireland (island), large island in the state of Papua New Guinea
 New Ireland Province, administrative division of Papua New Guinea

Politics 

 New Ireland Forum, reported in 1984 with recommendations for ending the Troubles
 Éire Nua, an Irish republican political agenda

History 

 New Ireland (Maine), an abortive 18th-century British Colony in modern-day Maine and New Brunswick
 New Ireland, a proposed renaming of Prince Edward Island, led by then lieutenant governor Walter Patterson in 1770
 New Ireland, a short-lived territory proclaimed by the Castle Hill convict rebellion in Australia

Business 

 New Ireland Assurance, part of the Bank of Ireland Group